Stephanie Roorda (born 3 December 1986) is a Canadian professional racing cyclist, who currently rides for UCI Women's Team . She rode at the 2015 UCI Track Cycling World Championships, winning a bronze medal in the Team Pursuit.

Major results
2007
 National Track Championships
1st  Points race
1st  Keirin
2008
 National Track Championships
1st  Scratch
1st  Team pursuit
1st Young rider classification Liberty Classic
2009
1st Team pursuit, 2009–10 UCI Track Cycling World Cup Classics, Cali
1st  Team pursuit, National Track Championships
2010
1st  Team pursuit, National Track Championships
3rd Team pursuit, 2009–10 UCI Track Cycling World Cup Classics, Beijing
2011
2nd Team pursuit, 2010–11 UCI Track Cycling World Cup Classics, Beijing
2013
1st Team pursuit, Los Angeles Grand Prix (with Allison Beveridge, Laura Brown, Gillian Carleton and Jasmin Glaesser)
2014
 2nd Team pursuit, UCI Track World Championships
3rd Omnium, Los Angeles Grand Prix
2015
 Pan American Track Championships
1st  Points race
2nd Team pursuit (with Allison Beveridge, Annie Foreman-Mackey and Kirsti Lay)
2nd Omnium, Milton International Challenge
Independence Day Grand Prix
2nd Points race
3rd Scratch
Grand Prix of Colorado Springs
2nd Individual pursuit
3rd Omnium
 3rd Team pursuit, UCI Track World Championships
2016
3rd Scratch, UCI Track World Championships
3rd Omnium, Track-Cycling Challenge Grenchen

References

External links

1986 births
Living people
Canadian female cyclists
Cyclists from Alberta
Sportspeople from Calgary
Pan American Games gold medalists for Canada
Pan American Games medalists in cycling
Cyclists at the 2018 Commonwealth Games
Commonwealth Games medallists in cycling
Commonwealth Games bronze medallists for Canada
Cyclists at the 2011 Pan American Games
Medalists at the 2011 Pan American Games
Medallists at the 2018 Commonwealth Games